The Route of the Monasteries of Valencia (GR-236) is a religious and cultural route that connects five monasteries located in central region of the Province of Valencia, (Valencian Community), in Spain. The Route was inaugurated in the year 2008.

The Monasteries 
The route includes the following five monasteries: 
1 Monastery of Sant Jeroni de Cotalba, in Alfauir.
2 Monastery of the Corpus Christi, in Llutxent.
3 Monastery of Santa María de la Valldigna, in Simat de la Valldigna.
4 Monastery of Aguas Vivas, in Carcaixent.
5 Monastery of la Murta, in Alzira.

Itineraries 
There are four distinct itineraries. The first road, for condition for hiking: the GR-236 (over 90 km in length), the second route, access to the monasteries with vehicles. The four routes are different and each one goes through different towns, but both routes pass by the five monasteries.

On foot (GR-236).
By car.
Bicycle (MTB).
By horse (IE-001).

Route GR-236

The route on foot 
The walk route passes through ancient medieval historical paths as the Pas del Pobre (passage of the poor), riding trails, mountain trails, old roads and railroad tracks. It starts at the train station in Gandia and ends in Alzira, to connect to public transport. The route begins in Gandia Railway Station and ends on Alzira Railway Station.

The GR-236 is the international code of the Monasteries route by foot. It is a GR (GR footpath) officially approved by the Valencian Federation of Mountain Climbing.

The GR-236 begins in Gandía and finishes in Alzira passing by these monasteries:
1 Monastery of Sant Jeroni de Cotalba, in Alfauir.
2  Monastery of the Corpus Christi, in Llutxent.
3  Monastery of Santa María de la Valldigna, in Simat de la Valldigna.
4  Monastery of Aguas Vivas, in Carcaixent.
5  Monastery of la Murta, in Alzira.

All the paths are perfectly signposted from the Train Station of Gandia to Alzira. There are road signs in problematic forks with location signs and direction signs. The signs are white and red and they all have the path code (GR-236). To walk round this route you need 2 or 3 days. There is a main route (3–4 days) and there is another way where you can take a short cut in the route (2–3 days), but with the last option you can't see one of the monasteries (Corpus Christi, in Llutxent).

The route by car 
1 Monastery of the Corpus Christi
2 Llutxent
3 Benicolet
4 Monastery of Sant Jeroni de Cotalba
5 Gandia
6 Marxuquera
7 La Drova
8 Barx
9 Simat de la Valldigna
10 Monastery of Santa Maria de la Valldigna
11 Monastery of Aguas Vivas
12 La Barraca d'Aigües Vives
13 Alzira
14 Monastery of la Murta

The route by bicycle (MTB) 
The itinerary by bicycle (MTB) is a circular route of 123 km which starts and ends in Alzira and which crosses the central regions of La Safor, la Vall d'Albaida and La Ribera Alta. The itinerary has a specific signaling and a special path adapted to mountain bike.

The route by horse IE-001 
The itinerary by horse has a specific signaling and a special path adapted to horses and homologated by the Royal Spanish Equestrian Federation (RFHE) and their code is IE-001. It is the first route in Spain and the second in Europe to be approved as equestrian route. The itinerary starts in the Monastery of Sant Jeroni de Cotalba, near Gandia.

Credentials 
It's possible to collect a card in the Tourist Office of Gandia which credited the pilgrims passing through the various monasteries and towns.

Tourist Info 
Tourist Info Gandia
Avda. Marques de Campo s/n 46701 Gandia (Valencia) Ph 96 287 77 88  www.visitgandia.com

Tourist Info Ròtova
Plaza Mayor 7 - 46725 Rotova (Valencia)  Ph 96  283 53 16

Tourist Info Tavernes de la Valldigna
Avda. Marina s/n  46760 Tavernes de la Valldigna (Valencia) Ph 96 288 52 64 www.valldignaturisme.org

Tourist Info Alzira
Pl. del Reino  46600 Alzira (Valencia) Ph 96 241 95 51  www.alzira.es

Tourist Info Simat de la Valldigna
Passeig 9 de Octubre, s/n 46750 Simat de la Valldigna (Valencia) Ph 96 281 09 20

Bibliography 
Bernat Montagud Piera. "Monasterios Valencianos". Generalitat Valenciana, Conselleria de Cultura, Educació i Ciència. Rutes d'aproximació al patrimoni cultural valencià, Volumen nº 3. 1984. 
María Desamparados Cabanes Pecourt. Los monasterios valencianos. University of Valencia. Facultad de Filosofía y Letras, Departamento de Historia Medieval. 1974. 
Carlos Sarthou Carreres. "Monasterios Valencianos: su historia y su arte". La Semana Gráfica, Valencia, 1943.

See also 

 Monastery of Sant Jeroni de Cotalba
 Route of the Borgias
 PR-CV 100 (Route of the Monastery of Sant Jeroni de Cotalba)
 Route of the Castles of Vinalopó
 GR-160

References

External links

The Route 

Route of the Monasteries of Valencia  
Route of the Monasteries - IdealSpain.com 
The Route on the website of Gandia Tourist Info 
Maps and itineraries of the Route 
The route at the Valencian Community Tourist Info Website

The Monasteries 
Monastery of Sant Jeroni de Cotalba  
Monastery of Santa Maria de la Valldigna 

History of the Valencian Community
Monasteries in the Valencian Community
Monastery of Sant Jeroni de Cotalba
Tourism in the Valencian Community
Tourist attractions in the Valencian Community
Hiking trails in Spain
Cultural tourism in Spain